Dominique Casagrande (born 8 May 1971 in L'Union, Haute-Garonne) is a French former professional footballer who played as a goalkeeper.

Honours
Trophée des Champions: 1998

References

External links
 

Living people
1971 births
Sportspeople from Haute-Garonne
Association football goalkeepers
People from L'Union
French footballers
French expatriate footballers
French people of Spanish descent
FC Nantes players
Sevilla FC players
Paris Saint-Germain F.C. players
AS Saint-Étienne players
US Créteil-Lusitanos players
Ligue 1 players
Expatriate footballers in Spain
Segunda División players
Footballers from Occitania (administrative region)